Hymenobacter aerophilus  is a Gram-negative, non-spore-forming, aerobic and rod-shaped bacterium from the genus of Hymenobacter which has been isolated from airborne from the Museo Correr in Venice in Italy.

References

Further reading

External links
Type strain of Hymenobacter aerophilus at BacDive -  the Bacterial Diversity Metadatabase

aerophilus
Bacteria described in 2002